Nicholas, Nicky or Nick Robinson may refer to:

 Nick Robinson (journalist) (born 1963), British political journalist
 Nick Robinson (paperfolder) (born 1957), British origami artist
 Nicky Robinson (rugby union) (born 1982), Welsh rugby player
 Nick Robinson (English actor) (born 1986), British actor
 Nick Robinson (American actor) (born 1995), American actor
 Nicholas Robinson (historian) (born 1946), Irish author, historian, solicitor and political cartoonist; married to former Irish President, Mary Robinson
 Nicky Robinson (game programmer), computer game programmer
 Nicholas Robinson (bishop) (died 1585), Welsh bishop of Bangor
 Nicholas Robinson (mayor) (1769–1854), Lord Mayor of Liverpool
 Nick Robinson (basketball) (born 1979), college basketball head coach